Admiral Frank Finnis   (8 November 1851 – 17 November 1918) was a British Royal Navy admiral before the First World War.

Early life
Finnis was born in 1851, the son of Steriker Finnis, of Dover. He was educated at Highgate School from 1862 and entered the Royal Navy in 1864.

Navy career
Finnis was promoted to lieutenant in 1874, commander in 1886, and to captain on 1 January 1893. He was appointed in command of the second class cruiser HMS Amphion on 7 January 1897, and served on the Pacific Station until the ship paid off at Devonport on 13 February 1900. In early February 1900 it was announced that Finnis would be appointed in command of the battleship Collingwood, but the appointment was cancelled, and he was appointed in command of the battleship Illustrious until early 1902. On 20 June 1902 he was appointed Commodore, 2nd class in command of the protected cruiser HMS Cambrian, and Commander of the South East American Station, where the Cambrian was senior officers's ship. Before departure from London, he was received in audience by King Edward VII on 11 June, on his appointment as commander of the station, and he arrived to take up the post the following month. In August 1902 he visited Montevideo and Santos, Brazil with the Cambrian.

He was promoted to Rear-admiral in 1905, and was appointed commander of the Chatham division in the Home Fleet the following year. After his promotion to the rank of Vice-Admiral on 15 November 1908 he was placed on the Retired List at his own request on 9 February 1909. He was advanced to the rank of Admiral on the Retired List on 20 March 1913. On 24 April 1915 he was granted a temporary commission as a captain in the Royal Naval Reserve.

Family
Finnis married, in 1906, Anna MacRobin, daughter of Professor John MacRobin, Aberdeen, and widow of Herbert Lake.

References

1851 births
1918 deaths
People educated at Highgate School
Royal Navy admirals
Commanders of the Royal Victorian Order
Royal Naval Volunteer Reserve personnel of World War I
Royal Navy officers of World War I
Royal Naval Reserve personnel